The 1993 World Wushu Championships was the 2nd edition of the World Wushu Championships. It was held at the Stadium Negara in Kuala Lumpur, Malaysia from November 21 to November 27, 1993. For the countries in Asia, this was the qualifying event for the 1994 Asian Games.

Medal summary

Medal table

Men's taolu

Men's sanda

Women's taolu

References



World Wushu Championships
Wushu Championships
World Wushu Championships, 1993
World Wushu Championships, 1993
Wushu in Malaysia
November 1993 sports events in Asia
1993 in wushu (sport)